Maunalua (Hawaiʻi Kai) is a largely residential area located in the City & County of Honolulu, in the East Honolulu CDP, on the island of Oahu.  Maunalua (Hawaiʻi Kai) is the largest of several communities at the eastern end of the island. The area was largely developed by Henry J. Kaiser around the ancient Maunalua fishpond and wetlands area known as Kuapā (meaning "fishpond wall"). The Hawaii Kai or Koko Marina was dredged from Kuapā Pond starting around 1959.  Dredging not only transformed the shallow coastal inlet and wetlands into a marine embayment, but was accompanied by considerable filling and clearing of the pond margins.  In 1961, Kaiser-Aetna entered into a lease agreement with the land owner, the Bernice Pauahi Bishop Estate, to develop the 521 acre (2.11 km2) fishpond into residential tracts with a marina and channels separated by fingers of land and islands upon which house lots and commercial properties would be laid out and developed. Nearly all of the low-lying lands surrounding the marina have since been developed, and neighborhoods now extend back into the several valleys and up the separating ridges.

Geography
Immediately west of Maunalua (Hawaiʻi Kai) along Kalanianaole Highway (State Rte. 72) is the East Honolulu neighborhood of Kuliouou. Eastward from Hawaii Kai (Maunalua) on the same highway is the Koko Head area, an area now mostly included within Koko Head Park. South of Hawaiʻi Kai is Maunalua Bay, and north are the Koolau mountains.  Eventually the road crosses over to the windward side near Makapuu Point.

Hawaiʻi Kai is located approximately 12 miles east of the Central Business District (CBD) of Honolulu.

In the 2000 U.S. Census the U.S. Census Bureau defined Hawaiʻi Kai as being in the urban Honolulu census-designated place. For the 2010 U.S. Census the bureau created a new census-designated place, East Honolulu.

Native Hawaiian fishpond

Maunalua Bay was formerly renown for having the largest Native Hawaiian fishpond on Oahu. The 523 acre fishpond known as Keahupua-O-Maunalua had a wall or kuapā which originally spanned from Kuliouou headland and to what is now Portlock. The pond was used primarily to raise mullet (awaawa) and was also home to many endemic or indigenous waterbirds. The area remained important for fishing and agriculture until the 1950s when the fishpond was filled for housing development.

Communities
Kalama Valley is a community within the town of Maunalua, more commonly known as Hawaii Kai located on the eastern coast of the island of Oahu. It features a shopping center, a public park and basketball facilities, and predominantly single-family, relatively high-priced housing, due to its location in Maunalua (Hawaii Kai). There are a variety of attractions in the vicinity of Kalama Valley, including Hawaiʻi Kai Golf Course, Awawamalu (Sandy Beach), Makapuu Lighthouse and beach, Koko Crater Botanical Garden, the "From Here to Eternity" cove, and Hanauma Bay. 

"Kamehame Ridge" is a ridge located in the middle of Kalama and Kamilo Iki Valley. Kamehame Ridge was developed during the 1990s. Now there are multi-million dollars homes and real estate stretching from the bottom to the top of the Ridge. It is most famous for its popular hike, known locally as “Dead Man’s Catwalk”.

Demographics
Hawaiʻi Kai was home to 30,079 residents residing in 10,702 households during the period between 2009–2013.  The percentage of residents 25 and older with a bachelor's degree or higher was 51.8 percent.

Education
Maunalua is located within the Hawaii Department of Education Kaiser Complex and is home to Henry J. Kaiser High, Hahaione Elementary, Kamiloiki Elementary, and Koko Head Elementary Schools. The three elementary schools feed into Niu Valley Middle School, which in turn feeds into Kaiser High, although Niu Valley Middle is not located in Hawaii Kai.

See also 

 Kalama Valley protests

Gallery

References

External links

Neighborhoods in Honolulu
Henry J. Kaiser
Populated places established in 1961
1961 establishments in Hawaii
East Honolulu, Hawaii